Arianna Castiglioni (born 15 August 1997) is an Italian breaststroke swimmer. She was alternate at the 2020 Summer Olympics, in 4 × 100 m medley relay.

She won a bronze medal in the 100 m at the 2014 European Aquatics Championships.

References

External links

1997 births
Living people
Italian female breaststroke swimmers
Italian female swimmers
Swimmers at the 2016 Summer Olympics
Olympic swimmers of Italy
European Aquatics Championships medalists in swimming
People from Busto Arsizio
Mediterranean Games gold medalists for Italy
Mediterranean Games bronze medalists for Italy
Mediterranean Games medalists in swimming
Swimmers at the 2018 Mediterranean Games
Swimmers at the 2020 Summer Olympics
Sportspeople from the Province of Varese
20th-century Italian women
21st-century Italian women